Events from the year 1927 in Denmark.

Incumbents
 Monarch – Christian X
 Prime minister – Thomas Madsen-Mygdal

Events

Undated

Sports
 26 June  B 93 wins their second Danish football championship by defeating Skovshoved IF 51 in the final of the 1926–27 Landsfodboldturneringen at Københavns Idrætspark.
 1 October  Køge Boldklub is founded.

Births
 26 March – Palle Sørensen, convicted murderer (died 2018)
 19 August – Gert Petersen, journalist and politician (died 2009)
 1 May  Greta Andersen, swimmer (died 2023)

Deaths
 19 February – Georg Brandes, critic and scholar (born 1842)
 25 March – Johanne Hesbeck, photographer (born 1873)
 27 March – Klaus Berntsen, politician (born 1844)
 27 May – Oscar Stribolt, stage and film actor during the silent film era (born 1872)
 28 June – Otto Bache, painter (born 1839)
 31 August – Alhed Larsen, painter (born 1872)
 19 September – Michael Ancher, painter (born 1849)
 21 November – Laurits Tuxen, painter and sculptor (born 1853)

References

 
Denmark
Years of the 20th century in Denmark
1920s in Denmark
1927 in Europe